Gephyromantis plicifer, commonly known as the common Madagascar frog, is a species of frog in the family Mantellidae.  It is endemic to Madagascar.  Its natural habitat is subtropical or tropical moist lowland forests.  It is threatened by habitat loss.

References

plicifer
Endemic fauna of Madagascar
Taxonomy articles created by Polbot
Amphibians described in 1882